Brian MacPhie and Nenad Zimonjić were the defending champions but did not compete that year.

Jan-Michael Gambill and Andy Roddick won in the final 6–3, 6–4 against Thomas Shimada and Myles Wakefield.

Seeds

  Joshua Eagle /  Sandon Stolle (quarterfinals)
  Paul Haarhuis /  Fabrice Santoro (quarterfinals)
  David Adams /  Martín García (semifinals)
  Thomas Shimada /  Myles Wakefield (final)

Draw

External links
 2001 Citrix Tennis Championships Doubles Draw

2001
2001 ATP Tour
2001 Citrix Tennis Championships